Omkara is a 2004 Indian Kannada-language crime thriller film starring Upendra and Preeti Jhangiani. The film was written and directed by Shivamani and produced by Company Films under the banner of R. S. Productions and has music by Gurukiran. Omkara was Upendra's first gangster film and was based on the connection between film industries and the Mumbai underworld mafia. The film got an all-time record opening in its first week however became an above average grosser.

Cast

 Upendra as Sathya
 Preeti Jhangiani as Divya
 Rahul Dev as a Mumbai underworld kingpin
 Rangayana Raghu as Divya's father
 Sadhu Kokila
 Bank Janardhan
 Bullet Prakash
 Vaijanath Biradar
 Mimicry Dayanand
 Nagashekar
 Sadashiva Brahmavar
 Adarsha
 Vijayasarathi
 Shwetha Menon in a cameo appearance

Soundtrack
The film's soundtrack has seven songs composed by Gurukiran. Upendra, Gurukiran, Kaviraj and V. Manohar penned the lyrics.

Reception

Critical reception
Omkara received mixed to positive reviews upon release. Indiaglitz gave the film a very positive review by saying, "Omkara is a film made on a large canvas and can be compared to any non-Kannada film in terms of richness and presentation. The film has excellent production values, a big-star cast and all the commercial ingredients in right proportion to make it an attractive proposition for today's youngsters. Upendra excels in the role and his delivery of the lines is once again superb. His dialogues have been a major attraction in all his films and "Omkaara" is no exception."

Box office
Omkara collected all-time record in first week all over Karnataka. Besides the theatre rent the film collected 1.75 crore from 200 shows a day in Karnataka with 55 prints. Omkara also had great opening in the Telugu and Tamil belts. But the film failed to live up to expectations and turned out to be just a moderate success at the box office.

References

2004 films
2000s Kannada-language films
Films scored by Gurukiran
Indian gangster films